Victor Jacquemin (born 12 March 1892, date of death unknown) was a Belgian sprinter. He competed at the 1908 Summer Olympics in London, but failed to reach the finals of the 100 m and 400 m events.

References

Further reading
 
 
 

1892 births
Year of death missing
Belgian male sprinters
Olympic athletes of Belgium
Athletes (track and field) at the 1908 Summer Olympics